Wang Xingang (born 1 January 1932), is a Chinese actor. In 2014, he honored Golden Rooster Award for Lifetime Achievement Award.

Selected filmography

References

External links

1932 births
Living people
Chinese male film actors